,
Haden Guest (born 1971) in Geneva, New York, is a film historian, archivist and curator. He is Director of the Harvard Film Archive and Senior Lecturer in the Department of Art, Film and Visual Studies, Harvard University.

References

Connecticut College alumni
Living people
American film critics
Film theorists
1972 births
21st-century American historians
American male non-fiction writers
21st-century American male writers